Mansuriyeh-ye Yek (also Romanized as Manşūrīyeh-ye Yek) is a village in Anaqcheh Rural District, in the Central District of Ahvaz County, Khuzestan Province, Iran. At the 2006 census, its population was 305, in 63 families.

References 

Populated places in Ahvaz County